Kevin Tadeo Pereira Leguizamon (born 15 January 2004) is a Paraguayan footballer who plays as a forward for Argentinian side Talleres.

Club career
Pereira started his career with amateur side Río Salado de Limpio, and was recruited by Deportivo Capiatá at the age of thirteen. He made his debut for Capiatá at the age of fourteen in the Copa Paraguay against Teniente Fariña, becoming the youngest professional footballer in the country at the time.

Just after his eighteenth birthday, he moved to Argentina to join Talleres de Córdoba, stating that he felt "as if he were at home" with the Córdoba-based club.

International career
Pereira has represented Paraguay at youth international level.

Career statistics

Club

References

2004 births
Living people
Sportspeople from Asunción
Paraguayan footballers
Paraguay youth international footballers
Association football forwards
Paraguayan Primera División players
Deportivo Capiatá players
Talleres de Córdoba footballers
Paraguayan expatriate footballers
Expatriate footballers in Panama
Paraguayan expatriate sportspeople in Peru
Expatriate footballers in Peru
Paraguayan expatriate sportspeople in Mexico
Expatriate footballers in Mexico